Trichotrigona is a genus of bees belonging to the family Apidae.

The species of this genus are found in Southern America.

Species:

Trichotrigona camargoiana 
Trichotrigona extranea

References

Apidae